Anders Gravers Pedersen (born 13 May 1960) is a Danish anti-Islam activist. He is the chairman and founder of Stop the Islamisation of Denmark (SIAD) and leader of Stop Islamisation of Europe (SIOE). He has also been part of the transatlantic connections between SIOE and Stop Islamization of America.

Activities

Rallies
Gravers Pedersen has been instrumental in forming the street-based activist parts of the counter-jihad movement since he founded SIAD in 2005.

In March 2012, Gravers Pedersen participated in staging a rally and arranging an anti-Islamic conference along with the English Defence League in Århus. Two years earlier, in 2010, he was allegedly assaulted at a rally in Aalborg. In 2008 SIAD and Gravers Pedersen in the capacity of leading SIOE were each sentenced to pay fines of DKK 10,000 for violating a court order against using Kurt Westergaard's Muhammad cartoons at a rally.

Contesting elections
Gravers Pedersen attempted to run for a seat in the Danish parliament, Folketinget, in 2012 and in 2009. He  contested municipal elections in Aalborg in 2005 and gained 383 votes and the group  received a total of 1,172 votes. This represented less than 1% of the votes cast in the election. At the 2007 Danish Parliamentary Election Pedersen stood in Jutland and gained 73 votes.

References

Counter-jihad activists
Danish activists
Danish critics of Islam
Living people
1960 births